Icaros is the fifth album by Finnish melodic death metal band Diablo.

Track listing
 "Trail of Kings" – 4:54
 "Living Dead Superstars" – 4:19
 "Bad Sign" – 3:34
 "Resign From Life" – 4:38
 "Icaros" – 3:38
 "Light of The End" – 4:46
 "Chagrin" – 4:06
 "Through Difficulties To Defeat" – 3:37
 "Hammer" – 3:18
 "Into The Sea" – 8:04

Personnel 
 Rainer Nygård – Vocals, guitar
 Marko Utriainen – Guitar
 Aadolf Virtanen – Bass guitar
 Heikki Malmberg – Drums

2008 albums
Diablo (band) albums